United for Change (UfC) is a British political movement, founded on a centrist platform. The movement gained attention after fundraising through large donations from philanthropists and donors was reported. Although only launched in August 2018, it had reportedly been in the process of development for at least a year.
It has subsequently been rebranded as the United Party for its launch as a political party.

History 

In April 2018, British press reported that former Labour donor Simon Franks had set up a company, the Project One Movement, aimed at potentially forming a political party and fielding candidates at an election. It received commitments of roughly £5 million in funding from founders, and was compared to En Marche! in France. In August 2018, United for Change was launched as the political campaign name of the Project One Movement.

In late August 2018, one of the founders of the movement Adam Knight left to set up his own political organisation. He later voiced his support for the Liberal Democrats. The founders of United for Change are Simon Franks, Dr Saima Rana, Alex Chesterman OBE, Richard Reed CBE, Ceawlin Thynn, Ryan Wain, James Woolf.

Simon Franks has said he wants to make United for Change a grassroots movement, with the aim of launching United for Change as a registered political party just after Brexit.

As of June 2019, it has reportedly scaled back its ambition to win the next general election as a new party but still seeks to launch fully as a political movement once Brexit is resolved.

References

Further reading 
 



2018 establishments in the United Kingdom
Political parties established in 2018
Centrist political parties in the United Kingdom